Dhivya may refer to:

Places 
 Dhivya Matriculation Higher Secondary School, established in 1992 in Chetpet, Thiruvannamalai District, Tamil Nadu, India
 Dhivya College of Education, established in 2005 in Chetpet, Thiruvannamalai District, Tamil Nadu, India
 Dhivya Polytechnic College, established in 2008 in Chetpet, Thiruvannamalai District, Tamil Nadu, India

People 
 Dhivya Suryadevara, CFO of General Motors